The Argentine legislative elections of 1914 were held on 22 March. Voters chose their legislators, and with a turnout of 58%.

Background
 
The first elections following the 1912 enactment of the Sáenz Peña Law had opened Congress to myriad opposition parties to the ruling Conservatives. The UCR, which had spearheaded efforts for the law's passage (thereby extending universal suffrage to nearly all male citizens), emerged as the chief minority party in the Chamber of Deputies (Lower House); but remained doubtful as to the transparency of Senate and gubernatorial elections in a number of districts, notably the important Buenos Aires Province. Advised to do so by their longtime leader, Hipólito Yrigoyen, the UCR maintained their boycott of races beyond those of the Chamber of Deputies.

President Roque Sáenz Peña's deteriorating health cast a pall over these elections, and his indefinite transference of presidential power to Vice President Victorino de la Plaza saw the second-in-command continue the ailing president's policies in place, as the elections proceeded on Sunday, March 22, as scheduled.

Amid somewhat lower turnout, results were mixed: The UCR continued to make gains in the Chamber of Deputies, the lower house of Argentina's National Congress, electing 19 of the 60 seats at stake. They fared particularly well in Entre Ríos and Santa Fe Province, in which latter they received more than twice the votes of Santa Fe native Lisandro de la Torre's Southern League. The Socialist Party again defeated the UCR in the City of Buenos Aires, however, and by a wider margin than in 1913. Conservative Buenos Aires Province lawmaker Marcelino Ugarte, who had defeated the UCR in the 1913 Senate race, did so again in this year's gubernatorial contest, and became his party's effective leader. The Civic Union, representing those who broke from the UCR after its 1890 founding, continued to erode in influence, and following these elections, Honorio Pueyrredón announced its reunification with the UCR.

Results

References 

1914
1914 elections in South America
1914 in Argentina